Bonogin is a rural hinterland locality in the City of Gold Coast, Queensland, Australia.

Geography 
Bonogin is on the edge of the Gold Coast hinterland.

History
The origin of name is not known, but it is speculated that it is derived from the Aboriginal word Boonoo meaning red bloodwood.

European settlement commenced in the 1870s. The early industries were timber cutting and dairying. Later bananas were grown.

Approval was given to establish a school in 1913. Bonogin Creek State School opened on 7 July 1913. There were closures due to teacher shortages in 1917 and 1921. The school finally closed on 30 March 1924. The school building was relocated to Wunburra (near Springbrook) in 1934.

In the 1980s, some of the farms were subdivided to form acreage residential developments.

Bonogin Creek
Part of the City of Gold Coast's Beaches to Bushland volunteer restoration program includes Bonogin Creek. The primary tributary of the creek begins in the Gold Coast hinterland.  A hinterland regional park bushcare group was established in 1999 to address conservation of local plant species and also attempt to restore natural habitat of the creek. Davenport Park is a suburban park running along a lower point of the creek, within suburban Bonogin. In 2013 Bonogin Valley bushcare group formed to help with restoration of the park and creek area.

Amenities 
The Gold Coast City Council operates a fortnightly mobile library service which visits Davenport Park on Bonogin Road East.

References

External links

 

Suburbs of the Gold Coast, Queensland
Localities in Queensland